Turramurra High School is a large public comprehensive co-educational high school of approximately 1177 students, operated by the New South Wales Department of Education, located in South Turramurra, a residential area on the Upper North Shore of Sydney, New South Wales, Australia. Established in 1967, although the current premises weren't occupied until 1968, it adjoins the Lane Cove National Park. The school has links with nearby Macquarie University and the Whitehouse Institute of Design as well as local business organisations. The current school principal is David Arblaster.

Sports 

Turramurra High School holds annual athletics, swimming and cross country carnivals.

Sporting facilities at the school include two ovals, one indoor basketball court, and two outdoor basketball courts. The school is centrally placed to a number of sporting facilities such as 'The Field of Dreams' baseball diamond, Auluba Oval, West Pymble Pool, Canoon Tennis Courts & Netball Courts, West Pymble & Hornsby Gyms, Thornleigh Brickpit, Macquarie Centre Ice Rink and many dedicated ovals inside the area. The school also has convenient access to sports facilities at Macquarie University.

Notable alumni
Ianthe Astley-Boden-rugby union player
Shane Gouldswimmer; won gold medals for the 200m Individual Medley, 200m Freestyle, 400m Freestyle. 1 silver medal for 800m freestyle and bronze medal for 100m freestyle at the 1972 Munich Olympic Games
Tim JacksonSprinter; Represented Australia in the 1996 Olympics and two Commonwealth Games in 100m sprint and 4x100 relay; attended Turramurra High School from 1981 to 1986
Gail Neallswimmer; won gold medal for the 400m Individual Medley at the 1972 Munich Olympic Games
Amy Ridley- goalball athlete
Anne-Marie SchwirtlichDirector-General of the National Library of Australia (2011-2017) 
Dave Sharma Former Member for Wentworth since 2019; former Australian Ambassador to Israel; School Dux, 1993
Chris Tuatara-Morrison-rugby union player

See also
List of government schools in New South Wales

References

External links
 Turramurra High School website

Educational institutions established in 1967
1967 establishments in Australia
Public high schools in Sydney